New Zealand vs Samoa in rugby league is a rivalry between the New Zealand national rugby league team and the Samoa national rugby league team in the sport of rugby league. The two sides first met in 2010, and have faced each other four times, New Zealand winning each encounter.

Head to Head

Results

2010s

References

External links 

 New Zealand vs Samoa – Rugby League Project

Rugby league rivalries
New Zealand national rugby league team
Samoa national rugby league team
Sports rivalries in New Zealand